The electoral district of Launceston was a multi-member electoral district of the Tasmanian House of Assembly. It was based in  Tasmania's second city, Launceston, and the surrounding rural area.

The seat was created as a three-member seat ahead of the Assembly's first election held in 1856, and was abolished at the 1871 election, when it was divided up into the seats of Central, North and South Launceston.

At the 1897 election, the Hare-Clark electoral model was trialled in Launceston and Hobart, with Launceston being recreated as a 4-member seat. It continued for two terms, before being broken up again in 1903 into Central, North, East and West Launceston. In 1909, the entire state adopted Hare-Clark, and the Launceston region became part of the Bass division.

Members for Launceston
First incarnation: 1856–1871

Second incarnation: 1897–1903

References
 
 
 Parliament of Tasmania (2006). The Parliament of Tasmania from 1956

Launceston